On 21 February 1969 the Popular Front for the Liberation of Palestine (PFLP) carried out a bombing attack on a supermarket in Jerusalem, killing 21-year-old Leon Kanner of Netanya and 22-year-old Eddie Joffe, students at the Hebrew University, and  injuring 9.

Supermarket bombing

The deaths and injuries were caused by a bomb placed in a crowded Jerusalem SuperSol supermarket which the two students stopped in at to buy groceries for a field trip. The same bomb wounded 9 others. A second bomb was found at the supermarket, and defused.

In the investigation that followed the bombings, authorities uncovered an arsenal of PFLP weaponry including explosives.

Bombing of British Consulate
On 25 February 1969 the same PFLP terrorists planted two bombs in a window of the British Consulate in Jerusalem.  The bomb exploded in the apartment of a secretary at the consulate, who was not home at the time. There were no injuries, although the room was wrecked. A bombing attempt at the Consulate the previous Friday failed when the bomb was discovered and detonated.

Rasmea Odeh
These two attacks are often cited in connection with Rasmea Odeh, a PFLP activist who confessed to involvement and attained later a degree of notability after she was released from an Israeli prison in a prisoner exchange and violated American immigration laws. In 1980, Odeh was among 78 prisoners released by Israel in an exchange with the PFLP for one Israeli soldier captured in Lebanon.

References

Popular Front for the Liberation of Palestine attacks
Terrorist attacks attributed to Palestinian militant groups
Terrorist incidents in Asia in 1969
Terrorist incidents in Israel in the 1960s
1969 murders in Israel
Marketplace attacks in Asia